Pratap Chandra Chunder (1 September 1919 – 1 January 2008) was a union minister of India, educationist and author. He served in the Morarji Desai Ministry from 1977 to 1980 as a cabinet minister with education and social welfare portfolios.

Family and education
Chunder was the son of Nirmal Chandra Chunder, a prominent member of the Indian National Congress (INC) in the pre-independence era and a member of the Big Five of the Bengal Congress. He completed his BA (Hons.) in history at Presidency College, Calcutta, ranking first class first, and his LLB at the University of Calcutta. He was awarded a D Phil in Arts from the same university.

Career
From an early age Chunder joined the INC and became a member of the West Bengal Legislative Assembly from 1962-69. He was the Finance and Judicial Minister of West Bengal in 1968. From 1977 to 1979 he was the Education and Social Welfare Minister of India.

Chunder was an attorney-at-law at the Calcutta High Court and an advocate of the Supreme Court of India. He was member of Senate and the faculty of law of the Calcutta University between 1961 and 1968.

Chunder was the Founder-Chairman of West Bengal Heritage Commission and the President of the Board of Governors of IISWBM, India's first MBA school. From 2000 to 2005 he was a member of the executive council of the Rabindra Bharati University. Chunder was the President of the Presidency College Alumni Association from 1989-90 to 1993-94 and again during 1998-99.

Pratap Chandra Chunder died of cardiovascular disease on 1 January 2008, aged 88.

Publications
Chunder authored many historical novels and dramas. They are:

Bubhuksha
Smrtira Alinde 
Job Charnocker Bibi
Glimpses of Indian Culture: Ancient and Modern
Kautilya on Love and Morals

References

External links
Bagchee.com
Bookfinder.com
Education.nic.in
https://archivepmo.nic.in/drmanmohansingh/press-details.php?nodeid=697
Headlinesindia.com

1919 births
2008 deaths
Presidency University, Kolkata alumni
Education Ministers of India
20th-century Indian lawyers
University of Calcutta alumni
India MPs 1977–1979
Lok Sabha members from West Bengal
Indian National Congress (Organisation) politicians
Indian National Congress politicians from West Bengal
Novelists from West Bengal
20th-century Indian novelists
Indian historical novelists
Politicians from Kolkata